The 2011 I-League U19 was the third edition of the I-League U19.

All teams played the other teams in their group once and the group winners (4 group winners) play 3 final fixtures against each other, producing 6 games a season for the group winners and just 3 games for the other teams that did not make the final stage. JCT won the title on better goal difference.

League Tables
The first phase of the U-19 Football Tournament for I-League teams was held from 26 April – 6 May 2011 at four venues. Group A saw teams from Goa battling out for a place in the final round. Dempo, Salgaocar, Churchill Brothers and Sporting Clube de Goa are clubbed in Group A. 

Kolkata hosted Group B encounters which featured East Bengal, Mohun Bagan, Chirag United and Shillong Lajong. ONGC, Mumbai, Pune FC and FC Air India were in Group C and played their matches in Mumbai with Punjab hosting Group D matches of teams comprising JCT, Viva Kerala and HAL.

Schedules and Results

Group A — Goa

Group B — Kolkata

Group C — Mumbai

Group D — Punjab

Final phase

References

2010–11 in Indian football
I-League U19 seasons